Karosa ŠL 11 is an intercity bus produced by bus manufacturer Karosa from the Czechoslovakia, in the years of 1970 to 1981. It was succeeded by Karosa C 734 in 1981.

Construction features 
Karosa ŠL 11 is completely different from its predecessor, Škoda 706 RTO-CAR, which had engine in front and two doors.
ŠL 11 is model of Karosa Š series. It is derived from Karosa ŠM 11 city bus, and also unified with long-distance coach Karosa ŠD 11. Body is semi-self-supporting with frame and engine with manual gearbox in the middle, between the wheels. Only rear axle is propulsed. Front axle is independent, rear axle is solid. All axles are mounted on air suspension. On the right side are two folding doors (first are narrower than middle doors). Inside are used leatherette seats. Drivers cab is not separated from the rest of the vehicle.

Production and operation 
In 1970 started serial production, which continued until 1981.

ŠL 11 are not operated in public transport anymore, but many of them are operated as historical vehicles.

Historical vehicles 
Technical muzeum Brno

See also 

 List of buses

Buses manufactured by Karosa
Buses of the Czech Republic
Vehicles introduced in 1970